Xavier Margairaz (born 7 January 1984) is a Swiss former professional footballer who played as a midfielder.

Club career
Margairaz was born in Rances. After beginning professionally with FC Lausanne-Sport and Neuchâtel Xamax, he was part of the 2005–06 and 2006–07 Super League-winning teams of Fussballclub Zürich.

In May 2007, Margairaz signed a three-year contract with Spanish side CA Osasuna, where he struggled with first-team opportunities. In late February 2008, in a friendly match with SD Eibar, he suffered a serious knee injury (anterior cruciate ligament, internal lateral ligament and external meniscus). After a successful surgery in Geneva, he missed UEFA Euro 2008 as his recovery process was estimated to be of at least eight months; this happened a week after another serious knee-injured central midfielder of the Navarrese club, Javad Nekounam, began training.

On 14 January 2009, Margairaz moved back to FC Zürich on loan until the end of the season. In June, after he helped the team to another league title and Osasuna received €400.000, the move was made permanent.

On 15 September 2009, Margairaz became Zürich's first scorer in the UEFA Champions League, netting in a 2–5 home loss against Real Madrid in the group stage. In January 2012, he moved to FC Sion on a three-and-a-half year contract, leaving in June of the following year.

International career
A member of the Swiss national team since 2005, Margairaz was called up to the 2006 FIFA World Cup, where he had two late substitute appearances.

Personal life
Margairaz's older brother, Sascha, was also a footballer. He played mainly in the lower leagues and amateur football.

Honours
Zürich
Swiss Super League: 2005–06, 2006–07, 2008–09
Swiss Cup: 2004–05

References

External links

1984 births
Living people
People from Jura-North Vaudois District
Swiss-French people
Swiss men's footballers
Association football midfielders
Swiss Super League players
Swiss Challenge League players
FC Lausanne-Sport players
Neuchâtel Xamax FCS players
FC Zürich players
FC Sion players
Servette FC players
La Liga players
CA Osasuna players
Switzerland international footballers
2006 FIFA World Cup players
Swiss expatriate footballers
Expatriate footballers in Spain
Swiss expatriate sportspeople in Spain
Sportspeople from the canton of Vaud